Ahmad Abdulghafoor (born 2 June 1987) is a Kuwaiti footballer who is a defender for the Kuwaiti Premier League club Al-Salmiya SC.

He played for Al Arabi for many years, including in the 2007 AFC Champions League group stage, before joining Al-Salmiya SC in 2016.

References

1987 births
Living people
Kuwaiti footballers
Al-Arabi SC (Kuwait) players
Sportspeople from Kuwait City
Kuwait international footballers
Association football defenders
Al Salmiya SC players
Khaitan SC players
Kuwait Premier League players